The Certified Arborist credential identifies professional arborists who have a minimum of three years' full-time experience working in the professional tree care industry and who have passed an examination covering  facets of arboriculture. The Western Chapter of the International Society of Arboriculture (ISA) started the certification program in the 1980s, with the ISA initiating it in 1992.

References

External links
 International Society of Arboriculture

Forestry occupations